Holtefjell  is a mountain located on the border between Øvre Eiker and Flesberg in Buskerud, Norway.

External links
Map of Holtefjell

Flesberg
Øvre Eiker
Mountains of Viken